Kim Yeon-gun (born 12 March 1981) is a South Korean professional football player who is playing for Korea National League club Yongin City FC. His position is forward.

Career in Hong Kong
He joined South China in January 2009 and made his league debut on 11 January 2009 against Citizen. He scored his first goal for the team in his second match on 8 February in the 8–0 match against Tuen Mun Progoal.

Statistics in Hong Kong
 As of 8 February 2009

References

External links
 
 SouthChinaFC.com, 22. 金演健 

1981 births
Living people
Association football forwards
South Korean footballers
South Korean expatriate footballers
Jeonbuk Hyundai Motors players
Pohang Steelers players
Seongnam FC players
South China AA players
Incheon United FC players
Goyang KB Kookmin Bank FC players
K League 1 players
Hong Kong First Division League players
Korea National League players
Expatriate footballers in Hong Kong
South Korean expatriate sportspeople in Hong Kong
Dankook University alumni